The De Soto Open Invitational was a golf tournament on the PGA Tour that was held from March 24–27, 1960 at the De Soto Lakes Golf & Country Club in Sarasota, Florida. The club is now known as Palm-Aire Country Club and is located at Whitfield Avenue and Country Club Way. The event was won by then 47-year-old Sam Snead.

Winners

References

Former PGA Tour events
Golf in Florida
1960 establishments in Florida
1960 disestablishments in Florida